Child Marriage in Mali. In 2017 in Mali, 52% of girls are married off before the 18 yo. 17% are married before they turn 15. Mali is the 5th highest nation in the world for child marriage.

On October 11, 2015, First Lady of Mali Keïta Aminata Maiga launched a national campaign to end the practice of child marriage in Mali.

References 

Mali
Childhood in Africa
Society of Mali
Marriage in Africa